Elections to South Ribble Borough Council were held on 3 May 1979. The whole council was up for election and the Conservative Party retained its majority.

Election result

|}

Ward Results

Notes

References
 The Elections Centre, South Ribble Borough Council Election Results (PDF)

1979 English local elections
1979
1970s in Lancashire